or  is a mountain in the west of Kumamoto city, Kumamoto Prefecture, Japan. It is an extinct stratovolcano and lava dome. Mount Kinbō overlooks the city of Kumamoto and is used for sightseeing and for radio and TV broadcast antennas.

Geology
Older than nearby Mount Aso, it formed over the past 100 million years. Extensive volcanic activity took place 56 million years to 50 million years ago. The last eruption took place from 200,000 years to 150,000 years ago. In 1889 a 6.3 magnitude earthquake struck beneath the mountain. In 2016 the foreshock of the 2016 Kumamoto earthquakes also struck beneath Mount Kinbō.

History
Master swordsman Miyamoto Musashi wrote parts of his Book of Five Rings while staying on the mountain. Most of the mountain now lies within Kinpōzan Prefectural Natural Park.

See also
List of volcanoes in Japan

Notes

External links 
 
 Kinbo (Kinpo) Zan - Geological Survey of Japan
 

Mountains of Kumamoto Prefecture
Extinct volcanoes
Eocene volcanoes
Pleistocene volcanoes
Calderas of Kyushu